Antonio José Raíllo Arenas (born 8 October 1991) is a Spanish professional footballer who plays for RCD Mallorca as a central defender.

Club career
Born in Córdoba, Andalusia, Raíllo graduated from local Séneca CF's youth system, and made his debut as a senior with CD Pozoblanco in the 2010–11 season, in Tercera División. On 8 March 2011, he signed for Real Betis with the deal being made effective in June, and was subsequently assigned to the reserves in the Segunda División B.

In August 2012, Raíllo joined another reserve team, Córdoba CF B of the fourth division. On 9 July of the following year he transferred to RCD Espanyol on a one-year contract, moving to its B side in the third tier after achieving promotion with the former.

Raíllo agreed to a new deal with the Catalans on 22 May 2015, until 2018, being promoted to the main squad in La Liga. He first appeared in the competition on 22 August, playing the full 90 minutes in a 1–0 home win against Getafe CF.

On 27 January 2016, after being sparingly used, Raíllo was loaned to Segunda División club SD Ponferradina until June. He scored his first professional goal on 29 May, equalising the 1–1 away draw with CD Tenerife.

Raíllo signed a three-year contract with RCD Mallorca on 29 June 2016. Under Vicente Moreno, he was part of the squad that won two consecutive promotions to the reach the top flight in 2019.

Career statistics

Club

References

External links

1991 births
Living people
Spanish footballers
Footballers from Córdoba, Spain
Association football defenders
La Liga players
Segunda División players
Segunda División B players
Tercera División players
CD Pozoblanco players
Betis Deportivo Balompié footballers
Córdoba CF B players
RCD Espanyol B footballers
RCD Espanyol footballers
SD Ponferradina players
RCD Mallorca players